William Schiøpffe (often transcribed as William Schiopffe; 6 February 1926 in Bangkok – 2 January 1981 in Kopenhagen), was a Danish jazz drummer,

He began playing professionally in 1947. During his career he performed with Jørgen Ryg, Arne Domnérus, Bengt Hallberg, Lars Gullin, Max Brüel, Stan Getz (on Stan Getz at Large - 1960, In Sweden 1958-60), Bud Powell, Ella Fitzgerald amongst others.

References

External links

1926 births
1981 deaths
Danish jazz drummers